Santa Catalina Airport  is an airport serving Santa Catalina in the La Paz Department of Bolivia.

See also

Transport in Bolivia
List of airports in Bolivia

References

External links 
OpenStreetMap - Santa Catalina
OurAirports - Santa Catalina
Fallingrain - Santa Catalina Airport
Bing Maps - Santa Catalina

Airports in La Paz Department (Bolivia)